Ryan Boyle (born 17 October 1987) is an Ireland international rugby league footballer who plays as a  for Doncaster in Betfred League 1.

Background
Boyle was born in Leeds, Yorkshire, England.

Playing career
Boyle made his début for Castleford (Heritage № 840) in 2005.

In October 2009 Boyle was selected for the Irish national squad for the European Cup.

Boyle moved to Salford in 2010  but in April 2013 returned to Castleford and in October 2013 he signed a two-year extension to his contract.

At the end of April 2016 it was reported that Boyle had signed for Batley on Dual registration, but three weeks later he joined Halifax on a loan deal until the end of the season. in which he made 16 appearances and scored one try. The move was made permanent in October 2016 with a deal for the 2017 season.

In October 2017 Boyle joined Doncaster from Halifax on a two-year deal.

References

External links
Doncaster profile
Cas Tigers profile  
Castleford Tigers profile

1987 births
Living people
Castleford Tigers players
Doncaster R.L.F.C. players
English people of Irish descent
English rugby league players
Halifax R.L.F.C. players
Ireland national rugby league team players
Rugby league players from Leeds
Rugby league props
Salford Red Devils players